The Helpmann Award for Best Original Score is a musical award presented by Live Performance Australia (LPA) at the annual Helpmann Awards since 2001. In the following list winners are listed first and marked in gold, in boldface, and the nominees are listed below with no highlight.

Winners and nominees

Source:

See also
Helpmann Awards

Notes

References

External links
The official Helpmann Awards website

O
Australian music awards